This is a list of the U.S. Billboard magazine Hot 100 number-ones of 1992. The longest running number-one single of 1992 is "I Will Always Love You" by Whitney Houston, which stayed at the top of the chart for 14 weeks. "I Will Always Love You" became the longest running song at number one when it reached 14 weeks, breaking the record that Boyz II Men's "End of the Road" had just set at 13 weeks.

"End of the Road" broke the record previously set at 11 weeks by Elvis Presley in 1956 with "Hound Dog"/"Don't Be Cruel". "I Will Always Love You" would hold the record as the longest-running song atop the Hot 100 until "One Sweet Day" by Mariah Carey and Boyz II Men topped the chart for 16 weeks in 1995.

Although "I Will Always Love You" spent nine of its weeks atop the Hot 100 in 1993, it is considered the longest-running song of 1992 because that is when its run began.

A total of 12 songs topped the Hot 100, a record low since its debut in 1958. (Over 25 songs were number one each year from 1985 to 1991.) This is also the most recent year in which no artist had more than one song hit the No. 1 spot.

That year, 7 acts earned their first number one song: Right Said Fred, Mr. Big, Vanessa Williams, Kris Kross, Sir Mix-a-Lot, Boyz II Men, and The Heights.

Chart history

Number-one artists

See also
1992 in music
List of Billboard number-one singles

References

Additional sources
Fred Bronson's Billboard Book of Number 1 Hits, 5th Edition
Joel Whitburn's Top Pop Singles 1955-2008, 12 Edition
Joel Whitburn Presents the Billboard Hot 100 Charts: The Nineties
Additional information obtained can be verified within Billboard's online archive services and print editions of the magazine.

United States Hot 100
1992